"Double Up" is a song off R&B singer R. Kelly's eighth studio album of the same name. The song features Snoop Dogg, and revolves around Kelly's efforts to leave the club with two women (hence, he's "doubling up"). "Double Up" was in contention to be the third single released off the album; however, the other contender, "Rock Star," featuring Ludacris and Kid Rock, was chosen to be the third single. However, it reached number 1 on the Bubbling Under R&B/Hip-Hop Singles chart shortly after the album was released. The song samples "Ice Berg" from singer-songwriter Tweet's 2005 album It's Me Again.

Charts

References

R. Kelly songs
Songs written by R. Kelly
Song recordings produced by R. Kelly
2007 songs
Songs written by Nisan Stewart
Songs written by Snoop Dogg
Songs written by Craig Brockman
Songs written by Tweet (singer)